Jenő is a Hungarian male given name, equivalent to Eugene. In Austria and Germany the name is often simplified to Jenö (which in Hungarian is a shorter vowel) and pronounced as German umlaut ö. Jenő is also the legendary founder of one of Hungary's original tribes, and the name of that tribe. Since the 19th century it became a variant of Eugen.

People

Hungarian form Jenő 
 Jenő, one of the seven princes after which were named the seven Magyar tribes
 Jenő, Eugene of Savoy, Austrian rescuer of Hungary and national hero
 Jenő Barcsay (1900–1988), Hungarian painter
 Jenő Bódi (born 1963), Hungarian wrestler
 Jenő Bory (1879-1959), Hungarian architect and sculptor
 Jenő Brandi (1913–1980), Hungarian water polo player
 Jenő Buzánszky (1925–2015), Hungarian footballer
 Jenő Csaknády (1924–2001), Hungarian footballer and writer
 Jenő Dalnoki (1932–2006),Hungarian footballer
  (1903–1972), Hungarian film cameraman
  (1897/99–1944/45), Transylvanian Hungarian painter
  (1921–2011), Hungarian archaeologist and numismatist
 Jenő Fock (1916–2001), Hungarian communist politician
 Jenő Fuchs (1882–1955), Hungarian Olympic champion fencer
  (1906–1980), Hungarian composer
  (1944–2009), Hungarian historian
 Jenő Hubay (1858–1937), Hungarian violinist und composer
 Jenő Huszka (1875–1960),Hungarian composer
 Jenő Jandó (born 1952), Hungarian pianist
 Jenő Janovics (1872–1945), Hungarian film pioneer
 Jenő Kalmár (1908–1990),Hungarian footballer and trainer
 Jenő Károly (1886–1926), Hungarian footballer and trainer
 Jenő Konrád (1894–1978), Hungarian footballer and trainer
  (1860–1942), Hungarian doctor and amateur astronomer
  (1878–1919), Hungarian revolutionary, lawyer and politician
  (1885–1936), Hungarian Transylvanian painter
 Jenő Rejtő (1905–1943), Hungarian writer
 Jenő Takács (1902–2005), Hungarian-Austrian composer and pianist
  (1909–1966), Hungarian composer
 Jenő Vincze (1908–1988), Hungarian footballer and trainer

German form Jenö 

  (born 1934), German sociologist
  (1886–1965), German officer and politician (DNVP)
  (born 1925), German-Austrian art collector and businessman
  (1905–1958), Hungarian-Swiss writer

See also 
 Jenő (village), in Fejér county

References 

Hungarian masculine given names